Piotr Pyrdoł (born 27 April 1999) is a Polish professional footballer who plays as a winger for Skra Częstochowa.

Career

Club career

Pyrdoł started his career with ŁKS Łódź.

On 10 January 2020 Legia Warsaw confirmed that Pyrdoł had joined the club on a deal until June 2022 with an option for one further year. He took the shirt number 31. On 26 August 2020 he was transferred to Wisła Płock. Wisła loaned him first to Stomil Olsztyn in 2021.

On 3 February 2022, Pyrdoł left Wisła to join I liga side Skra Częstochowa.

Honours
Legia Warsaw
Ekstraklasa: 2019–20

References

1999 births
Footballers from Łódź
Living people
Polish footballers
Poland youth international footballers
Poland under-21 international footballers
Association football midfielders
ŁKS Łódź players
Legia Warsaw players
Wisła Płock players
OKS Stomil Olsztyn players
Skra Częstochowa players
Ekstraklasa players
I liga players
II liga players
III liga players